52 Sagittarii is a binary star system in the southern constellation of Sagittarius. It has the Bayer designation h2 Sagittarii, while 52 Sagittarii is the Flamsteed designation. This system is visible to the naked eye as a faint, blue-white hued point of light with an apparent visual magnitude of 4.59. It is located approximately 190 light years away based on parallax, but is drifting closer with a radial velocity of −19 km/s.

The primary component is a B-type main-sequence star with a stellar classification of B8/9V. It is around 57 million years old with three times the mass of the Sun and about 2.1 times the Sun's radius. It is radiating 60.5 times the luminosity of the Sun from its photosphere at an effective temperature of 10,592 K. The star is spinning with a projected rotational velocity of 48 km/s.

This object is magnitude 9.2 with a spectral class in the K2V-K4V range, and is believed to be the source of X-ray emissions from the system.

References

B-type main-sequence stars
Suspected variables
Sagittarius (constellation)
Sagittarii, h2
CD-25 14184
Sagittarii, 52
184707
096465
7440
Binary stars